State Route 726 (SR 726) is a  state highway in Churchill County, Nevada running through a rural area north of Fallon.

Route description

From there, the highway runs northeastward along Old River Road, a two-lane roadway following the Lower Soda Lake Drain through a rural agricultural area.

History
The alignment of present-day SR 726 can be seen on maps dating as early as 1937. At that time, the Old River Road portion of the highway was a minimally-improved part of State Route 1A, a highway that connected Fallon to US 40 southwest of Lovelock. However, SR 1A was rerouted to a newer alignment by 1957, thus removing the designation from Old River Road. SR 1A would later become US 95.

SR 726 was established as a state highway on January 1, 1978.

Major intersections

See also

References

726
Transportation in Churchill County, Nevada